Hoesung Lee (born December 31, 1945) is a South Korean economist and current chair of the Intergovernmental Panel on Climate Change. He is professor in the economics of climate change, energy and sustainable development in the Graduate School of Energy, Environment, Policy & Technology at Korea University in the Republic of Korea. Lee received his B.A. in economics from Seoul National University and a Ph.D. in economics from Rutgers University.
Lee began his career as an economist working for ExxonMobil. Lee was elected as the chair of the Intergovernmental Panel on Climate Change (IPCC) on October 6, 2015.
One of his elder brothers is Lee Hoi-chang, former Prime Minister of South Korea and three-time presidential candidate.

In his opening statement as Chair of the Intergovernmental Panel on Climate Change (IPCC) at the 48th Session held in Incheon, Korea in October 2018, he described this IPCC meeting as "one of the most important" in its history. The landmark Special Report on Global Warming of 1.5 °C (SR15) was released at the meeting on October 8, 2018.

Lee was named one of Time magazine's 100 Most Influential People of 2019.

References

Living people
Seoul National University alumni
Rutgers University alumni
Intergovernmental Panel on Climate Change lead authors
Academic staff of Korea University
People from Yesan County
1945 births